Commitment is an album led by American saxophonist Harold Vick recorded in 1967 but not released on the Muse label until 1974.

Reception
Allmusic awarded the album 3 stars.

Track listing
All compositions by Harold Vick except as indicated
 "Commitment" - 5:10
 "H.N.I.C. - 5:00
 "A Time and a Place" (Jimmy Heath) - 6:10
 "Out of It" - 5:30
 "Wild Is the Wind" (Dimitri Tiomkin, Ned Washington) - 4:18
 "Blue Gardenia" (Bob Russell, Lester Lee) - 4:24
 "From Within" - 4:48

Personnel
Harold Vick - tenor saxophone, soprano saxophone, flute
Victor Feldman - vibraphone, piano
Walter Bishop - piano 
Malcolm Riddick - guitar 
Herb Bushler, Ben Tucker - bass
Mickey Roker - drums

References

Muse Records albums
Harold Vick albums
1974 albums